The MCW Metrobus is a two and three-axle double-decker bus manufactured by Metro Cammell Weymann (MCW) between 1977 and 1989, with over 4,000 built. The original MkI was superseded by the MkII which had a symmetrical windscreen with an arched top in 1981, although production of the original MkI continued for the Greater Manchester Passenger Transport Executive and London Regional Transport until 1983 and 1985 respectively. The Metrobus was conceived as an integral product manufactured completely by MCW, but Alexander and Northern Counties also bodied some examples.

MCW planned to produce a single-decker version but this was not to come into production.

United Kingdom 

In the United Kingdom, the Metrobus was mainly used in the metropolitan areas, especially London, West Midlands and Greater Manchester.

London 
London Transport purchased 1,440 MkI examples between 1978 and 1985, numbering them M1 to M1440. Two MkII prototypes were delivered to London Transport for the Alternative Vehicle Evaluation (AVE) programme in 1984, M1441 with a Gardner engine and Voith transmission and M1442 with a Cummins engine and Maxwell transmission, but no orders resulted. In 1987/88, due to a vehicle shortage, 14 were purchased secondhand from the Greater Manchester Passenger Transport Executive, West Yorkshire Passenger Transport Executive and Busways Travel and allocated to Potters Bar garage. London Transport's low-cost subsidiary Harrow Buses leased 29 new MkII Metrobuses in 1987, but returned them to their lessor three years later. London Transport's Metrobuses were the mainstay of the double decker fleet between 1987 and privatisation in 1994, when most of them passed to seven of the new operators.

MTL bought the London Northern company, with a host of 179 Metrobuses. It acquired more when it took over London Suburban Buses, and including some ex-London examples from its Merseyside operation. Garages were at North Acton, Holloway and Potters Bar. Metroline Northern operations in London dwindled during 2002, with Ms replaced by low-floor buses on most routes. Some were retained through 2003 to deputise on AEC Routemaster routes, but operation on TfL services ceased in July 2004, the final three examples based at Potters Bar garage being the last Metrobuses in regular London service at the time.

London General reached the end with Metrobuses in normal service in February 2003, when Stockwell Garage's last were withdrawn. This left a handful of Metrobuses for special purposes; M1440 and open-top OM171 from the private hire fleet at Sutton and M1435 painted into a "spotted cow" livery for an art exhibition. Some were also retained as driver trainers.

First CentreWest, First Capital and London United also reached the end with Metrobuses in normal service in 2003. Arriva London also continued using Metrobuses until these were finally displaced in 2002/03; however Arriva would operate the final Metrobus in London service (M1332) on the 121 in January 2006.

Some of the MCW Metrobuses were converted to open-top for use by The Original Tour. The last were withdrawn by December 2007. London Pride Sightseeing also had MCW Metrobuses, but these were sold to Ensignbus. By 2014, there were no MCW Metrobuses licensed for use in London.

West Midlands 

The West Midlands Passenger Transport Executive and its successor,  West Midlands Travel, also purchased significant numbers of Metrobuses (over 1,100), both MkI and MkII examples. The first order for five MCW Metrobuses was placed in 1977, with the first delivered in January 1978.

Fifty dual-purpose Metrobuses with high-back seats, were purchased in 1986. Many of these buses were converted to normal seated buses and continued in service until November 2008. They were mainly used on limited-stop services. Fourteen guided buses were delivered for route 65 (branded Tracline 65), which was the first guided bus system in the UK, although the experiment only lasted a couple of years. All of the 14 guided buses were converted for conventional use. However they were distinguishable by their dot matrix destination display and gap in the front wheel arch where the guidewheels had been fitted.

In early 1995 Marshall Bus of Cambridge were contracted to overhaul all of West Midland Travel's Metrobus fleet. This was the largest used bus overhaul programme in Europe at the time and Marshalls set up a dedicated business division and staff to handle it. Many unavailable parts had to be sourced and made to original patterns by the Marshall procurement team. A production line was established in one of Marshall's aircraft hangars and anything up to 30 Metrobuses could be found in work at some stage along the line. Duration of refurbishment of each bus was usually 2-3 per week. No powerline items were included with the result that original engines were simply put back in the overhauled buses as they were. This had the effect that as the vehicles were driven from the West Midlands to Marshalls at Cambridge and driven back once completed and frequently broke down. Over 600, mainly MkII, Metrobuses were overhauled with the contract terminated abruptly in 1999 due to lack of confidence in Marshall Bus over delays with WMT orders for new single deck buses. 

The last Metrobuses were withdrawn from regular service in March 2010, being reduced to school services before their final withdrawal on 24 July 2010. A few were retained as driver training vehicles until 2017, however. In 2017 National Express West Midlands purchased a preserved 'Timesaver' example (D957 NDA, 2957) to add to its vintage hire fleet. National Express West Midlands (then Travel West Midlands) had previously sold this bus to a dealer in 2003. As a result, National Express West Midlands now owns a Metrobus for events and hire.

Greater Manchester 

The Greater Manchester Passenger Transport Executive (GMPTE) initially ordered 190 MkI MCW Metrobuses which were delivered between 1979 and 1983, alongside an unfulfilled order of 15 out of 190 Leyland Titans. Five of the PTE's early Metrobuses would be sold to London Buses in 1987.

Around 1986, Northern Counties delivered 30 more MCW Metrobuses built with Manchester standard bodywork, intended for the 'Trans Lancs' 400 express service linking Bolton with Stockport.

West Yorkshire 

The West Yorkshire Passenger Transport Executive and its successor Yorkshire Rider purchased over 100 Metrobuses, a majority of these being MkIIs. Some were bodied with Walter Alexander bodywork. Two MkIIs and two Alexander Metrobuses were sold to London Buses.

One MkII Metrobus was converted by Yorkshire Rider to operate as a demonstrator for a guided busway in Leeds. This made use of parts supplied from West Midlands Travel's guided busway Metrobuses.

South Yorkshire 
South Yorkshire Passenger Transport Executive (SYPTE) purchased a total of 170 MkI and MkII Metrobuses following comparative trials in 1979. These were delivered in five batches from 1980 to 1985, with some being specified with dual doors. These were joined by ten MkII Metrobuses in 1986 that were delivered with coach seats for 'Fastline' express work.

Also in South Yorkshire, Yorkshire Traction took delivery of twelve Metrobuses in 1986, an order initially placed when Yorkshire Traction were a National Bus Company subsidiary. These Metrobuses were unique in that they were built to a low height specification.

Other operators 

In Scotland, the Greater Glasgow Passenger Transport Executive and its successor Strathclyde Buses purchased 70 MkI, MkII and Alexander-bodied Metrobuses over from 1979 to the end of production in 1989. Metrobuses with Alexander bodywork proved popular with the Scottish Bus Group, with Midland Scottish taking on a total of 109 by 1986. Most of these would be transferred to Kelvin Scottish following the reorganisation of the SBG.

The Tyne and Wear Passenger Transport Executive bought five Metrobuses on evaluation in 1979. These were sold to London Buses in 1988, where they would become M1481-M1485; these would be the final Metrobuses to be acquired by London Transport before the privatisation of London Buses. Merseybus purchased 25 MkII Metrobuses in 1989 while also acquiring many second hand from privatised London operators. Fifteen Metrobuses, some with Alexander bodywork, were purchased new by the predecessor of Merseybus, Merseyside PTE.

Other municipal bus operators who bought Metrobuses included Kingston upon Hull City Transport, Leicester City Transport, Newport Transport and Reading Transport. The Metrobus also found sales to National Bus Company subsidiaries Maidstone & District and Northern General, with the former ordering two pairs of MkI Metrobuses with MCW and Rolls-Royce engines as part of NBC comparative trials in 1980.

Hong Kong

Early introductions 

In Hong Kong, China Motor Bus (CMB) introduced 12 Metrobuses (MC1-MC12) in 1978 for its luxury coach services (which covered the routes between Repulse Bay, Stanley and the Central District). Within a year, MCW produced an 11-metre 2-axle version of Metrobus. Only 40 were produced for CMB in 1978/79, where they would be classified as MB1-MB40. They were used mostly on express and cross-harbour services. Both batches of CMB Metrobuses had MkI bodies.

1980s 

In 1981, MCW produced prototypes of 3-axle, 12-metre long "Super-Metrobuses". Two were purchased by CMB as ML1-ML2 and three by Kowloon Motor Bus (KMB) as M1-M3, later renumbered 3M1-3M3. All were bodied with MCW MkII bodies. CMB purchased a further 82 (ML3-84) between 1983 and 1988, while KMB purchased 80 2-axle Metrobuses (M1-M80, with MkII bodies) between 1983 and 1985.

While KMB was not interested in the 12-metre version Super-Metrobuses, they did express their interest in an 11-metre 3-axle version (the CMB 11-metre version Metrobuses were 2-axle) with 254 11-metre 3-axle Metrobuses (S3M1-254) purchased between 1986 and 1989. Fifty of these buses were fitted with Cummins engines, and another one (later numbered S3M145) was originally fitted with a prototype air-conditioner, but this proved unreliable and was subsequently removed.

Between 1987 and 1989, Kowloon-Canton Railway Corporation (KCRC) also purchased 59 2-axle Metrobuses for their feeder bus services. 39 of them (101-139) were brand new with MkII bodies, while another 20 (140-159) were second-hand buses purchased from South Yorkshire PTE with MkI bodies, some of them with dual-doors.

Argos Bus purchased 6 Metrobuses for their non-franchised routes and private hire services between 1988 and 1989. They were from the same batch as those bought second-hand by KCRC.

KMB purchased eight further 2-axle Metrobuses (M81-M88) in 1989. These buses were fitted with Cummins LTA10-B282 (282 hp) engines and Voith D864G 4-speed gearbox, and were used on the hilly KMB Route 51 (between Tsuen Wan and Kam Tin, climbing Tai Mo Shan along its way). Later KMB fitted some of its older Metrobuses with Cummins engines, in order to avoid excess damage to buses running the hilly route.

Withdrawal 

The MkI second-hand Metrobuses were the first to be withdrawn, and all of them have since been scrapped. Many of the KCRC Metrobuses were loaned to Citybus for few years before final withdrawal.

CMB removed its MC-class Metrobuses from the luxury routes after introducing Dennis Darts for the service in 1991, preserving the seating layout. These Metrobuses were allocated to non-luxury routes in the Southern District, Hong Kong, as well as route 13 serving the "Mid-levels". Although CMB was the first to introduce Metrobuses, it withdrew only 3 of them (all were accident victims) before the end of its franchise in August 1998. Its earliest Metrobuses were 20 years old at that time. New World First Bus purchased all the remaining CMB Metrobuses and Super-Metrobuses when it took over most of the CMB routes, and converted 3 MC-class Metrobuses to training buses. In 2000, the last of the MCW Metrobuses were de-registered, briefly exported to The Original Tour, Big Bus Tours or to Australia. Some of the MCW Metrobuses were brought back to The Original Tour in the year 2006. As of 2013, the last of the examples from United Kingdom were withdrawn.

KMB allocated its 3 Super-Metrobuses to the New Territories for many years. For example, they were serving on route 61A (which connected Tuen Mun and Yuen Long new towns) right before the KCR Light Rail took over the services. After that, they were seen on route 36A (which connected a public housing estate in Kwai Chung to a ferry pier) until the route's decline in the mid-1990s. They spent a few further years as spare buses before being withdrawn from passenger service in 1996 and converted to training buses. They were finally sold and scrapped in 2001.

KMB started to withdraw its 2-axle Metrobuses in 1997. Some of them had their chassis damaged due to the fatigue caused during their service on the Tai Mo Shan KMB Route 51, which climbed to the highest altitude achievable by buses in Hong Kong. These were withdrawn by 2003. The 11-metre 3-axle Metrobuses in KMB were not withdrawn until summer 2002. KCRC also started to withdraw their Mark II Metrobuses in the early 2000s. The last 2-axle Metrobus in Hong Kong (KCRC 134) was withdrawn in October 2005.

The last Metrobus in Hong Kong (fleet number S3M233, license no. EH8559) ceased operation on 8 May 2007. As of mid-2011, no more Metrobuses were licensed and in use in Hong Kong.

End of production 
Production of the Metrobus ceased in 1989 with the financial collapse of MCW. The last Metrobus built was West Midlands Travel 3124(G124FJW), it had a message from the builders stating that it was the last one built by MCW and signed by the staff on the inside of the roof.

The Metrobus design was purchased by Optare in 1990, which had recently joined the United Bus group with DAF Bus. Despite owning design and production rights, the two companies heavily reworked the design to produce a new vehicle, the DAF DB250 based Optare Spectra, which was launched in 1991 and ceased production in late 2006.

See also 
Scania Metropolitan
MCW Metroliner
Optare Spectra
List of buses

References

External links 

Buses of the United Kingdom
Double-decker buses
Tri-axle buses
Vehicles introduced in 1978